

Madasun was a three-piece British girl group, who had chart success in the UK and Australia in 2000, scoring three top 30 hits.
 	
The group consisted of Vicky Barrett (born Victoria Barrett, 12 February 1976, Hertfordshire), Abby Norman (born Abigail Norman, 13 April 1977) and Vonda Barnes previously married to TV director Ross Norman (born 20 January 1978, in Hertfordshire). They got a demo deal with V2 Records and went to Sweden to record two songs on a trial basis. They went on to release three singles and one album on V2 Records. "Don't You Worry", the most successful of the three singles, reached number 14 in the UK and number six in Australia, also being certified platinum in Australia and reaching number 20 on the Australian year-end singles chart of 2000. The album The Way It Is failed to break into the top 75 of the UK Albums Chart (entering at number 153) and they were dropped due to poor sales, in January 2001, with the group subsequently breaking up.

Discography

Albums

Singles

References

External links
 Interview on Girl.com.au

English girl groups
English pop music groups
English dance music groups
British pop girl groups
British musical trios
V2 Records artists
Musical groups established in 1997
Musical groups disestablished in 2001